Of Drag Kings and the Wheel of Fate is a published book of fiction in the genre of Lesbian literature set in Buffalo, New York.  It was written by Susan Smith, who often goes by Smitty. It was originally published in June 2002 through Justice House Publishing; and was re-released in August, 2006 through Bold Strokes Books.

  (First release)
  (Second release)

Its sequel, Burning Dreams, was first released in December, 2006.

See also 
 Drag king

External links 
 About the author
 The New Library of Alexandria

2002 American novels
American LGBT novels
Novels with lesbian themes
Novels set in Buffalo, New York
Drag (clothing)-related mass media